Benayoun, or occasionally Benayun or Benayon, is a surname. Notable people with the surname include:

Amir Benayoun (born 1975), Israeli singer-songwriter
Maurice Benayoun, French artist
Michaël Benayoun (born 1973)
Robert Benayoun, French film critic and  author
Yossi Benayoun (born 1980), Israeli football player
Isaac Benayon Sabba, Brazilian Businessman

See also 
Ayoun
Ayun (disambiguation)

Arabic-language surnames
Maghrebi Jewish surnames
Surnames of Moroccan origin
Sephardic surnames